Hope is the skeleton of a blue whale displayed in the main hall of the Natural History Museum, London.

A juvenile female blue whale was found by a fisherman Edward Wickham on 25 March 1891, stranded on a sand bar in Wexford Harbour, on the southeast coast of Ireland.  The whale struggled in the shallow waters for two days until it was killed by Wickham with an improvised harpoon.  The Receiver of Wreck sold the carcass at auction for £111 to the local harbour master William Armstrong, from which Wickham and the other salvagers were paid £50 for their work.  After the whale flesh and blubber were removed, the Natural History Museum in London bought the 221 bones of the 4.5-tonne skeleton, along with its baleen plates, for £250.

The  skeleton was kept in storage until 1934, when it went on display in the museum's new Mammal Hall, suspended above a similarly sized plaster model of a blue whale.

It was taken down in 2015 for conservation work, and redisplayed in 2017, suspended from the ceiling in the museum's main entrance hall, the Hintze Hall, in a naturalistic diving lunge feeding posture.  The previous main exhibit, a diplodocus cast known as Dippy, had been displayed in the main hall since 1979.

Analysis of isotopes in the baleen plates published in 2018 indicated that the whale was perhaps 15 years old, living in the tropical Atlantic for the first seven years, and then spending some years migrating north to feed on krill in the northern Atlantic each summer and then migrating back south each winter.  Towards the end of its life, the whale spent around a year in the tropics, perhaps with a calf, and it was during a migration back north through the Irish Sea that the whale became stranded.

References
 Museum unveils 'Hope' the blue whale skeleton, Natural History Museum, 13 July 2017
 Blue whale skeleton 'Hope' takes centre stage in Museum, Natural History Museum, 13 July 2017
 The secret history of Hope the blue whale has finally been revealed, Natural History Museum, 21 September 2018
 The secret life of Hope: Britain's favourite Blue Whale, University of Southapton, 18 October 2019 
 On the trail of the Wexford blue whale, Natural History Museum 
 Examining the blue whale: the move begins, Natural History Museum
 Whale move: conservation commences, Natural History Museum
 The blue whale: a three-year labour of love, Natural History Museum

Individual blue whales
Natural History Museum, London